William Henry Light (11 June 1913 – 15 February 1979) was an English footballer who played for Southampton and West Bromwich Albion as a goalkeeper in the 1930s.

Football career

Southampton
Light was born in Woolston, Southampton and played his youth football for the works teams from the local shipyards, John I. Thornycroft & Company and Harland & Wolff. In May 1932, he joined Southampton as an amateur, signing his first professional contract in September 1933.

He made his first-team debut, replacing long-serving 'keeper Bert Scriven, in a 1–0 victory over Swansea Town on 5 February 1934. In only his fourth match, against Hull City at The Dell on 24 February, he displaced his left knee cap in a collision, putting him out of the game for several months.

He eventually returned to the team in March 1935 and retained his place for the rest of the 1934–35 season. He continued as the first choice custodian for the start of the "Saints" golden jubilee season. By now, he had gained a reputation as one of the country's leading goalkeepers and in March 1936, with the club in financial difficulties, he was sold to First Division West Bromwich Albion for a fee of £2,000, causing "a storm of protest" among the club's fans.

West Bromwich Albion
At The Hawthorns, Light was understudy to England international Harold Pearson and in his three years with the "Baggies", he only made 30 appearances in all. In a league match at Stoke City on 4 February 1937, he conceded 10 goals in Albion's heaviest defeat in the Football League.

Colchester United – player and coach
Light joined newly formed Colchester United, then in the Southern League, as a player-coach in 1938, helping the new club claim the Southern League title at the end of his first season. After the Second World War, he continued his association with the club, as a trainer, until his eventual retirement in 1968.

Honours

Club
Colchester United
 Southern Football League champions: 1938–39

References

External links
Video of Light training with Southampton in 1934

1913 births
Footballers from Southampton
1993 deaths
English footballers
Association football goalkeepers
English Football League players
Southern Football League players
Southampton F.C. players
West Bromwich Albion F.C. players
Colchester United F.C. players